United Nations Security Council Resolution 60, adopted on October 29, 1948, resolved that a sub-committee be established consisting of the United Kingdom, Republic of China, France, Belgium and the Ukrainian Soviet Socialist Republic to consider all the amendments and revision which had been suggested to the second revised draft resolution contained in document S/1059/Rev.2 and prepare a revised draft resolution on behalf of the Council.

The resolution was adopted without vote.

See also
List of United Nations Security Council Resolutions 1 to 100 (1946–1953)

References
Text of the Resolution at undocs.org

External links
 

 0060
 0060
October 1948 events